Charles Frederick Tonks  MBE (28 September 1881 - 27 March 1957) was an Anglican priest. He was the Archdeacon of Croydon from 1948 to 1957.

Tonks  was educated at King's College London and ordained in 1909. After a curacy at St Luke's Hackney he was the Secretary of the Church of England Temperance Society. He was Rector of St George's with St Mary Magdalene's Canterbury then Rural Dean of Canterbury. He was then Vicar of Walmer from 1928 to 1947 and an officiating chaplain to the British Armed Forces during World War II.

References

1881 births
Alumni of King's College London
Members of the Order of the British Empire
Archdeacons of Croydon
British military chaplains
World War II chaplains
1957 deaths